WBON (98.5 FM, "La Nueva Fiesta") is a Spanish-language tropical music formatted  radio station, licensed to Westhampton, New York and serving eastern Long Island. The station is owned by JVC Media LLC with studios located in Ronkonkoma, New York and transmitter located in Manorville, New York.

History 

98.5 FM went on the air September 15, 1993 as WMRW, simulcasting the modern rock of WDRE (92.7 FM).  This would continue throughout the 1990s, with the call sign of 98.5 changing to WLIR-FM, WLRI, and finally WDRE.  In 2004, the modern rock simulcast ended, 98.5's format changed to classic rock, and the call sign changed to WBON ("98.5 the Bone").  The classic rock format lasted until March 2007.  At that time, Jarad Broadcasting was attempting to sell its stations to the Business Talk Radio Network, and as a result the station became WBZB, "Business Talk New York."  Programs on WBZB included Doug Stephan's morning show, American Scene with Steve Crowley, an afternoon show hosted by Ray Lucia, and Chick Chat, a talk show geared toward women.  The sale fell through, and the call letters were changed back to WBON on September 10, 2007.

After stunting with a simulcast of sister station WDRE (Party 105), and a pre-produced loop of random sound bites, WBON became Long Island's newest 24/7 Spanish-language station at noon on September 20, 2007.  The station kicked off by airing 10,000 songs in a row.

On October 2, 2009 the sale of the station by The Morey Organization to JVC Media LLC was completed.

References

External links 
 

Mass media in Suffolk County, New York
BON
BON
Radio stations established in 1993
1993 establishments in New York (state)